Syngamia liquidalis is a moth in the family Crambidae. It was described by Zeller in 1852. It is found in Cameroon, the Democratic Republic of Congo (Katanga, Equateur, East Kasai) and South Africa.

References

Moths described in 1852
Spilomelinae